Manuel de Freyre y Santander (29 November 1872 – 1 April 1944) was a Peruvian diplomat. He was Ambassador of Peru to the United States from 1930 to 1944 and Minister Plenipotentiary to the United Kingdom, Argentina, Colombia, China and Japan.

Biography
He was born in 1872 at the Peruvian legation in Washington, D.C., the son of Colonel Manuel de Freyre y Santa Cruz and his third wife Clementina Santander y Pontón (daughter of Francisco de Paula Santander, 1st President of New Granada). At the time of his birth, his father was the Minister Plenipotentiary of Peru to the United States, a post he retained until his death in 1877. 

He received his early education in the United States and England, then he studied civil engineering at the Universities of San Marcos, Pisa and Lausanne. He entered the diplomatic service in 1901 as attaché of the Peruvian Commission before the Arbitration Court at Berne. The following year, de Freyre was moved to Bogota, where he successively served as attaché, Second Secretary and Chargé d'affaires. In 1907 he was appointed First Secretary of the legation in Washington, D.C., then Chargé d'affaires in 1916 and finally promoted to Minister Plenipotentiary in 1917. 

In 1919 he was appointed Minister to China and Japan and likewise Minister to Colombia in 1922. In 1924, when de Freyre was serving as Minister in Buenos Aires, he was appointed as Peruvian delegate to the Plebiscitary Commission of Tacna and Arica, by which American Government issued an award arranging the boundary dispute between Peru and Chile produced as a consequence of the War of the Pacific. 

De Freyre returned as Minister to Argentina, where he remained until 1926 when he was appointed Minister Plenipotentiary to the United Kingdom. In 1930 he was appointed Ambassador to the United States, a post he served during four administrations. In 1939 he became Dean of the Diplomatic Corps in Washington, D.C.

As his father before him, de Freyre died in office on 1 April 1944 in Washington, D.C. He was buried at Arlington National Cemetery.

References

1872 births
1944 deaths
People from Washington, D.C.
Peruvian diplomats
Peruvian Roman Catholics
Peruvian people of Spanish descent
Ambassadors of Peru to the United States